The  Gadabuursi script also known as the Borama alphabet,  is a writing script for the Somali language. It was devised around 1933 by Sheikh Abdurahman Sh. Nur of the Gadabuursi clan.

History

Though not as widely known as Osmanya, the other major orthography for transcribing Somali, Borama has produced a notable body of literature mainly consisting of qasidas.

The Borama or Gadabuursi script was devised in 1933 by Sheikh Abdurahman Sheikh Nuur, a Qur'anic teacher and son of Borama's qadi (judge), who devised the new orthography for transcribing the Afro-Asiatic Cushitic Somali language. A quite accurate phonetic writing system, this Borama script was principally used by Sheikh Nuur, his circle of associates in the city and some of the merchants in control of trade in Zeila and Borama. Students of Sheikh Nuur were also trained in the use of this script. .The alphabet is also generally known as the Gadabuursi script.

See also
Kaddare
Osmanya
Somali orthography

Notes

References
I.M. Lewis (1958), The Gadabuursi Somali Script, Bulletin of the School of Oriental and African Studies, University of London, Vol. 21, pp. 134–156.
David D. Laitin, Politics, language, and thought: the Somali experience, (University of Chicago Press: 1977)

External links
Osmanya, Borama, Wadaad's writing and the Somali language
Somali reconstruction and Local Initiative: Amoud University. Published in World Development (2001).
The Gadabuursi Somali Script - qasidas in Gadabuursi/Borama
Afkeenna iyo fartiisa - a book in Osmanya
The report of the Somali Language Committee

Writing systems of Africa
Somali language
Somali orthography